USS Chochise (YTB-216) was a tugboat of the United States Navy named for Cochise, a chief of the Chokonen band of the Chiricahua Apache.

Construction
She was laid down as a wooden-hulled ship (Originally YT-216) in Ipswich by W. A. Robinson Inc. In July 1944, she was acquired by the United States Navy and assigned to New York Harbor.

Service history
Chochise remained in service until 1966, when decommissioned and struck from the Naval Vessel Register.

References
Cochise (YTB-216)

Ships built in Ipswich, Massachusetts
Tugs of the United States Navy
World War II auxiliary ships of the United States
1944 ships